Alan Welsh (9 July 1947 – 16 August 2020) was a Scottish footballer who played as a winger. He made 261 appearances in the Football League for Millwall, Torquay United, Plymouth Argyle and Bournemouth.

References

1947 births
Living people
Footballers from Edinburgh
Scottish footballers
Association football wingers
Bonnyrigg Rose Athletic F.C. players
Millwall F.C. players
Torquay United F.C. players
Plymouth Argyle F.C. players
AFC Bournemouth players
Cape Town City F.C. (NFL) players
English Football League players
National Football League (South Africa) players